The 1939 All England Championships was a badminton tournament held at the Royal Horticultural Hall, Westminster, England from 7–12 March 1939.

It was the last to be held before the Second World War and would not reoccur until 1947.

Final results

Results

Men's singles

Women's singles

References

All England Open Badminton Championships
All England
All England Open Badminton Championships in London
1939 in badminton
March 1939 sports events
1939 in London